Asfaw Wossen (āsfā wossen) is an Ethiopic male given name.

Persons named Asfaw Wossen

Asfaw Wossen Amha Iyasus, ruler of Shewa in the later 18th century.
Asfa-Wossen Asserate, author, political consultant, and aristocrat, 
Asfaw Wossen Haile Selassie, eldest son and heir of Emperor Haile Selassie I, who later adopted the regnal name of Amha Selassie I in pretense.

Ethiopian given names
Compound given names